Hilmar Willi Duerbeck (19 July 1948 – 5 January 2012) was a German astronomer.

He studied at the University of Bonn and worked at the Observatory Hoher List. He was married to astronomer Waltraut Seitter.

External links 
 
 
 Homepage
 Hilmar W. Duerbeck 
 
 

20th-century German astronomers
University of Bonn alumni
1948 births
2012 deaths
21st-century German astronomers